Enterococcus faecalis – formerly classified as part of the group D Streptococcus system – is a Gram-positive, commensal bacterium inhabiting the gastrointestinal tracts of humans. Like other species in the genus Enterococcus, E. faecalis is found in healthy humans and can be used as a probiotic. The probiotic strains such as Symbioflor1 and EF-2001 are characterized by the lack of specific genes related to drug resistance and pathogenesis. As an opportunistic pathogen, E. faecalis can cause life-threatening infections, especially in the nosocomial (hospital) environment, where the naturally high levels of antibiotic resistance found in E. faecalis contribute to its pathogenicity.
E. faecalis has been frequently found in reinfected, root canal-treated teeth in prevalence values ranging from 30% to 90% of the cases. Re-infected root canal-treated teeth are about nine times more likely to harbor E. faecalis than cases of primary infections.

Physiology 

E. faecalis is a nonmotile microbe; it ferments glucose without gas production, and does not produce a catalase reaction with hydrogen peroxide. It produces a reduction of litmus milk, but does not liquefy gelatin. It shows consistent growth throughout nutrient broth which is consistent with being a facultative anaerobe. It catabolizes a variety of energy sources, including glycerol, lactate, malate, citrate, arginine, agmatine, and many keto acids. Enterococci survive very harsh environments, including extremely alkaline pH (9.6) and salt concentrations. They resist bile salts, detergents, heavy metals, ethanol, azide, and desiccation. They can grow in the range of 10 to 45 °C and survive at temperatures of 60 °C for 30 min.

Pathogenesis 
E. faecalis is found in most healthy individuals, but can cause endocarditis and sepsis, urinary tract infections (UTIs), meningitis, and other infections in humans. Several virulence factors are thought to contribute to E. faecalis infections. A plasmid-encoded hemolysin, called the cytolysin, is important for pathogenesis in animal models of infection, and the cytolysin in combination with high-level gentamicin resistance is associated with a five-fold increase in risk of death in human bacteremia patients. A plasmid-encoded adhesin called "aggregation substance" is also important for virulence in animal models of infection.

E. faecalis contains a tyrosine decarboxylase enzyme capable of decarboxylating L-dopa, a crucial drug in the treatment of Parkinson's disease. If L-dopa is decarboxylated in the gut microbiome, it cannot pass through the blood-brain barrier and be decarboxylated in the brain to become dopamine.

Antibacterial resistance

Multi drug resistance 

E. faecalis is usually resistant to many commonly used antimicrobial agents (aminoglycosides, aztreonam and quinolones. The resistance is mediated by the presence of multiple genes related to drug resistance in the chromosome or plasmid.

Resistance to vancomycin in E. faecalis is becoming more common. Treatment options for vancomycin-resistant E. faecalis include nitrofurantoin (in the case of uncomplicated UTIs), linezolid, quinupristin, tigecycline and daptomycin, although ampicillin is preferred if the bacteria are susceptible. Quinupristin/dalfopristin can be used to treat Enterococcus faecium but not E. faecalis.

In root-canal treatments, NaOCl and chlorhexidine (CHX) are used to fight E. faecalis before isolating the canal. However, recent studies determined that NaOCl or CHX showed low ability to eliminate E. faecalis.

Development of antibiotic resistance

Combined drug therapies 

According to one study combined drug therapy has shown some efficacy in cases of severe infections (e.g. heart valves infections) against susceptible strains of E. faecalis. Ampicillin- and vancomycin-sensitive E. faecalis (lacking high-level resistance to aminoglycosides) strains can be treated by gentamicin and ampicillin antibiotics. A less nephrotoxic combination of ampicillin and ceftriaxone (even though E. faecalis is resistant to cephalosporins, ceftriaxone is working synergistically with ampicillin) may be used alternatively for ampicillin-susceptible E. faecalis.

Daptomycin or linezolid may also show efficacy in case ampicillin and vancomycin resistance.

A combination of penicillin and streptomycin therapy was used in the past.

Tedizolid, telavancin, dalbavancin, and oritavancin antibiotics are FDA approved as treatments against EF.

Survival and virulence factors
 Endures prolonged periods of nutritional deprivation
 Binds to dentin and proficiently spreads into dentinal tubules via chain propagation
 Alters host responses
 Suppresses the action of lymphocytes
 Possesses lytic enzymes, cytolysin, aggregation substance, pheromones, and lipoteichoic acid
 Utilizes serum as a nutritional source
 Produces extracellular superoxide under selected growth conditions that can generate chromosomal instability in mammalian cells
 Resists intracanal medicaments (e.g. calcium hydroxide), although a study proposes elimination from root canals after using a mixture of a tetracycline isomer, an acid, and a detergent
 Maintains pH homeostasis
 Properties of dentin lessen the effect of calcium hydroxide
 Competes with other cells
 Forms a biofilm
 Activates the host protease plasminogen in a fashion that increases local tissue destruction

DNA repair

In human blood, E. faecalis is subjected to conditions that damage its DNA, but this damage can be tolerated by the use of DNA repair processes.  This damage tolerance depends, in part, on the two protein complex RexAB, encoded by the E. faecalis genome, that is employed in the recombinational repair of DNA double-strand breaks.

Historical 

Prior to 1984, enterococci were members of the genus Streptococcus; thus, E. faecalis was known as Streptococcus faecalis.

In 2013, a combination of cold denaturation and NMR spectroscopy was used to show detailed insights into the unfolding of the E. faecalis homodimeric repressor protein CylR2.

Genome structure
The E. faecalis genome consists of 3.22 million base pairs with 3,113 protein-coding genes.

Treatment research
Glutamate racemase, hydroxymethylglutaryl-CoA synthase, diphosphomevalonate decarboxylase, topoisomerase DNA gyrase B, D-alanine—D-serine ligase, alanine racemase, phosphate acetyltransferase, NADH peroxidase,Phosphopantetheine adenylyltransferase (PPAT), acyl carrier protein, 3‐Dehydroquinate dehydratase and Deoxynucleotide triphosphate triphosphohydrolase are all potential molecules that may be used for treating EF infections.

Small RNA 
Bacterial small RNAs play important roles in many cellular processes; 11 small RNAs have been experimentally characterised in E. faecalis V583 and detected in various growth phases. Five of them have been shown to be involved in stress response and virulence.

A genome-wide sRNA study suggested that some sRNAs are linked to the antibiotic resistance and stress response in another Enteroccocus: E. faecium.

See also 
 Anti-Q RNA

References

External links

 Type strain of Enterococcus faecalis at BacDive –  the Bacterial Diversity Metadatabase

faecalis
Bacteria described in 1906